Bigourdan Fjord is a sound,  long in an east-west direction and averaging  wide, lying between Pourquoi Pas Island and the southwest part of Arrowsmith Peninsula, along the west coast of Graham Land in Antarctica. It was discovered by the French Antarctic Expedition, 1908–10, under Jean-Baptiste Charcot, and named by him for Guillaume Bigourdan, a noted French astronomer. It was roughly surveyed by the British Graham Land Expedition, 1934–37, under John Riddoch Rymill, and resurveyed by the Falkland Islands Dependencies Survey, 1948–50.

See also
Swash Reef

References
 

Sounds of Graham Land
Loubet Coast